Anushka Perera (born 6 November 1993) is a Sri Lankan cricketer. He made his first-class debut for Kalutara Physical Culture Club in Tier B of the 2016–17 Premier League Tournament on 2 December 2016.

References

External links
 

1993 births
Living people
Sri Lankan cricketers
Kalutara Physical Culture Centre cricketers
Place of birth missing (living people)